Demi cinta belahlah dadaku is a 1991 Indonesian drama film directed by Nasri Cheppy.

Cast
Nurul Arifin as  Halimah 
Imuda as  Sam 
Ade Irawan   
Alex Manopo   
W.D. Mochtar   
Hari Mukti   
Tile

External links
 

1991 films
1990s Indonesian-language films
1991 drama films
Films shot in Indonesia
Indonesian drama films
Films directed by Nasri Cheppy